Hajji Mosayyeb (also Romanized as Ḩājjī Moşayyeb) is a village in Benajuy-ye Gharbi Rural District, in the Central District of Bonab County, East Azerbaijan Province, Iran. At the 2006 census, its population was 102, in 23 families.

References 

Populated places in Bonab County